TSS Slievemore was a twin screw steamer passenger and cargo vessel operated by the London and North Western Railway from 1904 to 1923, and the London, Midland and Scottish Railway from 1923 to 1932.

History

She was built by Harland and Wolff of Belfast for the London and North Western Railway in 1904.

She was named after Slievemore, the highest peak on Achill Island, in County Mayo, Ireland. Its elevation is 671 metres.

Her Captain, Samuel David Pritchard, was awarded an MBE in 1920 in recognition of his services at sea during the First World War.

She was scrapped in 1932, and the London, Midland and Scottish Railway replaced her with a new vessel of the same name, Slieve More.

References

1904 ships
Passenger ships of the United Kingdom
Steamships
Ships built in Belfast
Ships of the London and North Western Railway
Ships built by Harland and Wolff